Squalidus mantschuricus is a species of cyprinid fish found in the Amur and Liao rivers in Asia.

References

Squalidus
Taxa named by Tamezo Mori
Fish described in 1927